HLA-DR4 (DR4) is an HLA-DR serotype that recognizes the DRB1*04 gene products. The DR4 serogroup is large and has a number of
moderate frequency alleles spread over large regions of the world.

Serology

The serological identification of DR4 is good. The serology of DRB1*04:17 to *04:60
is unknown.

Disease associations

By serotype
DR4 is associated with extraarticular rheumatoid arthritis, hydralazine-induced female systemic lupus erythematosus, pemphigoid gestationis, pemphigus foliaceus, obstructive  hypertrophic cardiomyopathy, IgA nephropathy, 'shared syndrome'-systemic sclerosis/rheumatoid arthritis and polymyalgia rheumatica.

By allele
DRB1*04 is associated with increased risk for alopecia areata.

DRB1*04:01 is associated with multiple sclerosis, rheumatoid arthritis, type 1 diabetes, lyme disease induced arthritis.
HLA-DRB1*04:01 gene variant is found three times more often in asymptomatic carriers of SARS-CoV-2 than in patients with symptoms of COVID-19. It is known that the prevalence of the HLA-DRB1*04:01 variant directly correlates with the latitude and longitude of the population. This variant of the gene is more common in northern and western Europe, which means that people of European descent are more likely to be asymptomatic carriers that can transmit the disease to more susceptible populations.

DRB1*04:02: drug-triggered/idiopathic pemphigus vulgaris, type 1 diabetes, SLE associated anti-cardiolipin and anti-β2 glycoprotein I.

DRB1*04:03: polycystic ovary syndrome, SLE associated anti-cardiolipin and anti-β2 glycoprotein I.

DRB1*04:04: anti-citrullinated fibrinogen in rheumatoid arthritis, autoimmune hepatitis.

DRB1*04:05: rheumatoid arthritis, Autoimmune hepatitis, type 1 diabetes.

DRB1*04:06: caspase-8 autoantibodies silicosis-systemic sclerosis (SSc)-systemic lupus erythematosus (SLE).

DRB1*04:09: T. cruzi infection with cardiomyopathy.

By haplotype
DR4-DQ8 is a risk factor for papillary thyroid carcinoma, juvenile diabetes, coeliac disease and rheumatoid arthritis.

DRB1*04:DQA1*03:03-DQB1*04:01 haplotype: type III autoimmune polyglandular syndrome, autoimmune hepatitis, autoimmune pancreatitis.

DRB1*04:DQA1*03-DQB1*03:02 haplotype: Type 1 diabetes with DRB1*04:01, *04:05, *04:02 increasing risk when DQ8 is present.

By genotype
DRB1*01:01/*04:04 and *01:01/*04:01 increases risk of mortality in rheumatoid arthritis, with ischemic heart disease and smoking. these same genotypes are associated with rheumatoid vasculitis.

Genetic linkage

References

4